Matoto is an urban sub-prefecture in the Conakry Region of Guinea and one of five in the capital Conakry. As of 2014 it had a population of 670,310 people.

Gbessia Airport is located in Matoto.

References

Sub-prefectures of Conakry